Cargobeamer is an intermodal transport system. It involves specially designed pallets which can be carried on a road trailer; the pallets are fitted on top of flatcars but can slide sideways to allow trucks to drive on and off smoothly at intermodal terminals. A first testing terminal was opened in Leipzig in Germany; trial runs between Leipzig and Lithuania were planned in November 2010. Since July 2021, the first full CargoBeamer terminal is available to the public transport market in Calais, France.

CargoBeamer Routes 
The company advertises several routes:
 Kaldenkirchen – Domodossola (17 hours)
 Calais – Perpignan (24 hours)
 Calais – Domodossola (19 hours)
 Kaldenkirchen – Perpignan (30 hours)

CargoBeamer Terminals

Calais (France) 

The first full CargoBeamer terminal was opened in Calais in July 2021 with a first connection to Perpignan in Southern France. Later that year, a second lane to Domodossola in Italy was added.

Domodossola (Italy) 
In March 2021, CargoBeamer announced the purchase of a railyard in Domodossola, Italy. The site was chosen to serve as the second terminal location entirely equipped with the CargoBeamer handling technology.

Competing systems 
Competing systems are offered by Modalohr and Cargospeed.

See also 
 Loading gauge
 Rolling highway
 Sidelifter
 Swap body
 Tank chassis

References

External links 
 Website of CargoBeamer

Intermodal transport
Transport in Europe
Freight rolling stock